Trévidic is a surname. Notable people with the surname include:

 (1921–2012), activist of the Breton language and culture
Marc Trévidic (born 1965), French judge

Breton-language surnames